Umaru Bangura (born 7 October 1987) is a Sierra Leonean professional footballer plays for the Sierra Leone national team. He is a central defender who can also operate in midfield.

Career
Bangura started his senior career with Hønefoss BK in Norway.

In January 2011, Bangura moved to Eliteserien club FK Haugesund. He made his league debut for the club on 20 March 2011 in a 2–0 away loss to Tromsø IL. He was subbed on in the 71st minute for Ugonna Anyora. He scored his first league goal for the club on 25 September 2011 in a 1–0 home victory over Aalesunds FK. His goal came in the 54th minute.

During the English 2013 summer transfer window, Bangura attracted interest from Premier League side Crystal Palace, but the move failed to materialise.

In December 2013 Bangura agreed to move to FC Dinamo Minsk in the Vysheyshaya Liga. He made his league debut for the club on 30 March 2014 in a 1–0 away victory over FC Dnepr Mogilev. He played all ninety minutes of the match.

In August 2016 he signed a three years contract with Swiss club FC Zürich. He made his league debut for the club on 22 August 2016 in a 1–0 home victory over Neuchâtel Xamax. He was subbed on for Armando Sadiku in the 84th minute. He scored his first league goal for the club on 2 October 2016 in a 5–0 away victory over FC Wohlen. His goal, scored in the 61st minute, made the score 4–0 to Zürich.

On 8 January 2021, it was announced that Bangura had joined Swiss Challenge League club Neuchâtel Xamax on a contract until the end of the season, after being released by Zürich.

International career
Bangura is the captain of the Sierra Leone national team. In October 2019, he stated that he was considering quitting the national team after his team was attacked by angry fans, but retracted his decision soon after and represented Sierra Leone at the 2021 Africa Cup of Nations, the country's first ever AFCON.

Career statistics

Club

International

Sierra Leone score listed first, score column indicates score after each Bangura goal

Honours
  Sierra Leone: Member of the Order of the Rokel (2017)

References

External links

1987 births
Living people
Association football defenders
Sierra Leonean footballers
Sierra Leone international footballers
Mighty Blackpool players
Hønefoss BK players
FK Haugesund players
FC Dinamo Minsk players
FC Zürich players
Neuchâtel Xamax FCS players
Norwegian First Division players
Eliteserien players
Swiss Super League players
Swiss Challenge League players
Temne people
Sierra Leonean expatriate sportspeople in Norway
Sierra Leonean expatriate sportspeople in Switzerland
Sierra Leonean expatriate footballers
Expatriate footballers in Norway
Expatriate footballers in Belarus
Expatriate footballers in Switzerland
2021 Africa Cup of Nations players